A set of rules for World War II and the immediate post-war years, for scales from 1:300 micro armour (company level or higher, as a general guide) to 1:72 (platoon level) scale, published by Wargames Research Group (WRG).

They were first published in 1973 as a development of the 1972 rules "War Games Rules Infantry Action 1925-1975", and later split into two eras covering 1925-1950, and 1950-2000.

The variations, as published by WRG, are set out in the table:

A computer-moderated adaptation of the 1988 edition was created by WargameSystems. This is claimed to preserve the WRG rules structure and key data while the software automates the mechanics of playing by these rules, hence saving time and increasing enjoyment of the game.

Core rules summary
Philosophy

Paraphrasing from the author’s introduction:
"The rules cover the period from the introduction of the fast tank until the introduction of ATGM, AFV range-finders and accurate APDS…the emphasis is on tactics, terrain, command and control…These rules are set in the real world of rain and mud, dust and mirage. The battles they simulate are not fought by nicely painted models but by men who are tired, frightened, dirty and often cold and hungry…Equipment performance and troop capabilities are based on those reported by real fighting units, rather than theoretical or artificial sources…differences in combat effectiveness that are not substantiated by careful research or that are insignificant compared with random factors are given only the attention they deserve."

Sequence of play

Alternate.

Time scale

One friendly and one enemy move = 5 minutes. Each move partly overlaps moves preceding and succeeding it.

Ground scale

Varies depending on the figure scale.

Troop scale

One figure represents one real equivalent. Infantry figures are based together in elements of 2 or 3 to 6.

Dice

One six sided dice is used throughout the rules.

Command and control

Each company (and if necessary, platoon) is given a one word order—Recce, Probe, Attack, Defend, Delay or Support—that specifies its task and imposes any tactical limitations. Some orders require additional information such as an objective, a line of advance, or boundaries. 

Orders can be changed during a battle by passing the new order(s) through the chain of command.

Communication

Command elements can communicate once with a superior command element, three times with subordinate command elements, and with all directly subordinate elements. 

Range and effectiveness depends on method—Personal, Line, Radio, Written, Signal.

Troop quality

Troops are classified as Inept, Green, Stubborn, Dashing, Skilled, Thrusting, Fanatic or Irregular. These classifications can restrict choice of Tactical Modes (explained hereafter) and also govern reactions to casualties and overrun situations.

Tactical Modes

Command elements can choose how to fulfil their orders by declaring a Tactical Mode – Salvo, Hold, March, Attack, Assault, Dash, Stalk, Skirmish, Slow, or Gap. Each Tactical Mode has its own movement and firing specifications.

An element’s choice of a Tactical Mode can be restricted by orders, troop classification, terrain and combat results.

Exigency Modes

These are the same as Tactical Modes except that they are imposed while specific circumstances apply, such as being shot at. When these cease, elements revert to their Tactical Modes.

Firing

For direct fire, first dice to check for full or partial acquisition, specify the type of fire—Aimed, Volley, Suppressive—then dice to see if the fire is effective. 

Area fire is not dissimilar to the above except that -
Area fire resources are allocated Under Command, In Direct Support, In General Support, to Counterbattery, or at Priority Call. These classifications determine responsiveness to requests for fire support (which may not always be approved when required and may sometimes be supplemented by additional firers).
Firing tasks are defined as Counterbattery, Programmed, Defensive or Impromptu. Each type of task has its own requirements for availability and activation.
Targets are classified as Registered, Observed, or Predicted; these classifications affect aiming point accuracy and corrections.
Possible fire patterns are Bombardment, Fireblow, Harassing, Concentration, or Barrage. These patterns have their own availability requirements and affect beaten zone dimensions and munition effectiveness.

Combat results

Successful fire causes the target to be Suppressed or Neutralised. Then check for Knock-out.

When carrying out Attack or Probe orders:
Neutralisation may cause a platoon to become pinned 
Pinning or Knock-out may cause a company to become repulsed (which in turn may require it to retreat or change to Hold orders).

Regardless of orders, overrunning may also cause retreat or surrender results.

If all of a company's troops retreat in the same move, a rout may ensue.

Repulsed, retreated or routed troops must be rallied before they can advance or be given a new order, as must troops that have attacked and occupied an objective.

References

Monographs
Barker P 1988, "A new WRG approach to wargaming tank combat," The Courier, vol VIII, no. 1
Peers C 1996, "An officer classification system for WRG, 1925-2000, Wargames Illustrated, March 

Miniature wargames
Playscale miniaturism
Wargames Research Group games